Kenneth Edward Bressett (born October 5, 1928) is an American numismatist. He has actively promoted the study and hobby of numismatics for over 50 years. His published works on the subject cover a wide range of topics and extend from short articles to standard reference books on such diverse areas as ancient coins, paper money, British coins and United States coins.

Career
Throughout his career he has worked as an author, editor and publisher of books and products for coin collectors. He has also taught the subject to hundreds of students through courses at Colorado College and other places.

Bressett was appointed to the United States Assay Commission in 1966 by President Lyndon Johnson, and in 1996 was made a member of the Citizens Commemorative Coin Advisory Committee. 

Bressett first became interested in coins in 1937 when his neighbor gave him a coin each from China and Belgium. He began collecting coins in earnest while he was a clerk in a grocery store in 1943 and through high school. Bressett attended Dresser Business School in 1947 and later studied graphic arts at the University of Wisconsin. He joined the American Numismatic Association in 1947 and attended their convention in Boston the following year. From 1949 until 1959 Bressett worked as a printer and compositor for Sentinel Publishing Company.

Bressett began free-lance editorial work on Red Book in 1956. He went to work for Richard S. Yeoman at Whitman Publishing in Racine in 1959. He wrote several books while at the publishing house and in 1962 became the editor of the Whitman Red Book and Blue Book. From 1964 to 1968 Bressett was the Editor and Publisher of the Whitman Numismatic Journal. Bressett was appointed to the United States Assay Commission in 1966 by President Lyndon Johnson. In 1971, following Yeoman’s retirement, he became editor of the Red Book.

Bressett coined the term "double die" to refer to the 1955 doubled die cent.

Bressett worked as a consultant for the F. Newell Childs collection that later sold at auction for over $8 million. In 1966, he was appointed to the U.S. Assay Commission by President Lyndon B. Johnson. He taught at the ANA Summer Seminar in 1975. In 1980, Bressett left Whitman to work for A. M. Kagin in Des Moines, Iowa. From 1982 to 1988 he worked at ANA as Director of ANACS. In 1986, he dove with Mel Fisher in Florida for the treasure of the sunken Nuestra Señora de Atocha. From 1983 to 1988 he also served as Director of Coin Authentication and Educational Programs for the American Numismatic Association.

Bressett was on the Board of Governors from 1989 to 1994, serving as Vice President and then served as President from 1995 to 1997.

For the next few years, he promoted the Peace 2000 project around the world. He served on the CCCAC commission from 1996 to 2003 and promoted the 50 State Quarters program.

Bressett retired from full-time editing in 2018 and is now listed as “editor emeritus”. In 2021, he released A Penny Saved: R.S. Yeoman and His Remarkable Red Book, an in-depth look at the history behind A Guide Book of United States Coins.

In March 2022, Bressett released a new book, Bible Lore and the Eternal Flame. At the National Money Show in Colorado Springs that same month, his collection of ancient and British coins was auctioned off.

Awards and Honors
Bressett has received numerous awards in recognition of his service and dedication to numismatics, including election to the National Numismatic Hall of Fame in 1996 the American Numismatic Association Medal of Merit, and the 1998 Chester L. Krause Memorial Distinguished Service Award (jointly awarded to both him and his wife Bert).

The American Numismatic Association named one of their Young Numismatist Literary Awards after Bressett, where articles submitted by people ages 18-22 can win awards and numismatic books.

In 2021, he was named one of the "Top 10" in Coin World'''s "Celebrating 60: The Most Influential People in Numismatics 1960-2020".

Books written or edited
 Money of the Bible Let's Collect Coins Basics of Coin Grading for U.S. Coin Buying and Selling United States Coins United States Coin Price Trends Collectible American Coins Collecting U.S. Coins The Fantastic 1804 Dollar A Guide Book of English Coins Official ANA Grading Standards for United States Coins A Guide Book of United States Coins The Handbook of United States Coins Guide Book of United States Currency Handbook of Ancient Greek and Roman Coins Whitman Guide to Coin Collecting: An Introduction to the World of Coins Milestone Coins: A Pageant of the World's Most Significant and Popular MoneyPersonal life
In 1950 he married Bertha "Bert" Britton. They had three children, Philip (1951), Richard (1954), and Mary (1955) before her death in 2012.

References

Sources
 The Guide Book on the Official Red Book of US Coins, by Frank J. Colletti, 2009, Whitman Publishing.
 The Guide Book of United States Coins, 2011, Whitman Publishing and Ken Bressett as provided.
 The Handbook of United States Coins''.

Members of the United States Assay Commission
American numismatists
Living people
1928 births
University of Wisconsin–Madison alumni
Colorado College faculty